The Pittsburgh Panthers men's basketball team has a combined record of 1,676 wins and 1,233 losses since their inception in 1905. The list is accurate as of March 19, 2023.

Seasons

  The Eastern Intercollegiate Conference held a single-game playoff for first place in the event of a tie at the end of the regular season. Conference record excludes single-game conference playoff victory.
  The Eastern Intercollegiate Conference held a single-game playoff for first place in the event of a tie at the end of the regular season. Conference record excludes single-game conference playoff loss after regular season.
  The Eastern Intercollegiate Conference held a single-game playoff for first place in the event of a tie at the end of the regular season. Conference record excludes single-game conference playoff victory after regular season.

References
2008–09 University of Pittsburgh Men's Basketball Media Guide

Pittsburgh
Pittsburgh Panthers basketball seasons